Saleh Ebrahim (also Romanized as Şāleḩ Ebrāhīm) is a village in Lalar and Katak Rural District, Chelo District, Andika County, Khuzestan Province, Iran. At the 2006 census, its population was 52, in 8 families.

References 

Populated places in Andika County